Upwork Global Inc., formerly Elance-oDesk, is an American freelancing platform headquartered in Santa Clara and San Francisco, California. The company was formed in 2013 as Elance-oDesk, after the merger of Elance Inc. and oDesk Corp. The merged company subsequently rebranded to Upwork in 2015.

In 2017, Upwork had over twelve million registered freelancers and five million registered clients. More than three million jobs worth over $1 billion USD together were posted in 2017.

In March 2022, Upwork was named to TIME's List of 100 Most Influential Companies of the year 2022.

History
Elance was founded in 1998 by MIT graduate Beerud Sheth and Wall Street veteran Srini Anumolu in a two-bedroom apartment in Jersey City. In December 1999, the company's 22 employees relocated to Sunnyvale, in California's Silicon Valley. Elance's first product was the Elance Small Business Marketplace.

oDesk was founded in 2003 by two friends, Odysseas Tsatalos and Stratis Karamanlakis, who wanted to work together even though one of them was in the U.S. and the other was in Greece. Originally created as a staffing firm, oDesk was eventually built into an online marketplace that allowed registered users to find, hire, and collaborate with remote workers.

Elance and oDesk announced their merger on December 18, 2013 to create Elance-oDesk. In 2015, the new company was rebranded as Upwork, which coincided with an upgrade of the oDesk platform under the same name. The newly named Upwork also planned to phase out the Elance platform within a couple of years. The Upwork platform has experienced brief outages, with one in September 2015 leading to an apology from then-CEO Stephane Kasriel.

The company was listed on the Inc. 5000 list from 2009 to 2014 and filed for an initial public offering on October 3, 2018.

On March 7, 2022, Upwork started suspending operations for freelancers and clients in Russia and Belarus as a sanction following Russia's invasion of Ukraine on 24 February 2022.

Service and business model 
Upwork allows clients to interview, hire and work with freelancers and freelance agencies through the company's platform. The client posts a description of their job and a price range they are willing to pay for a freelancer to complete it. The client may invite specific freelancers to apply for their jobs, or else post the job for any freelancer who is interested to apply. Once the client has chosen who they want to complete the job, they hire that freelancer by sending a contract with set hours, pay rate, and a deadline for the work to be completed.

The Upwork platform includes a real-time chat feature that either clients or freelancers can use to message prospects. The Upwork time tracking application records the freelancer's keystrokes and mouse movements and takes screenshots to be submitted to their client.

Size, scope, and changes 
In March 2017, Upwork reported 14 million users in 180 countries with $1 billion USD in annual freelancer billings.

In 2020, the company purged 1.8 million freelancers, possibly due to changes made under the leadership of new CEO Hayden Brown. In a 2019 call with investors, Brown said that Upwork would be focusing more on serving the needs of Fortune 500 companies rather than smaller companies just looking for a quick job with a single gig worker. During this call, Brown also spoke of a "skill gap" between what companies were looking for on the Upwork platform and what they were getting. Many of the freelancers purged were rated as "less skilled" or had lower rankings on the platform.

Upwork has also made other changes under Brown's leadership. The platform adopted paid client subscription rates, increased client payment fees from 2.75% to 3%, raised the cost of "Connects" (virtual tokens used by freelancers to submit job proposals), and changed the number of "Connects" needed for freelancers to submit job proposals. Brown has said that these changes were made to improve the quality of freelancers and freelance work available on the platform, but they also led to increased financial gains for Upwork and its investors.

In October 2020, Upwork launched a new feature called Project Catalog that allows freelancers and agencies to offer pre-scoped services at fixed prices, similar to Fiverr marketplace. 

In March 2021, Upwork released a report claiming that up to 25% of professionals expect to permanently work remotely.

See also 
 Behance
 
 Freelancer.com
 Guru.com
 PeoplePerHour
 Toptal

References

External links
 
 

2015 establishments in California
2018 initial public offerings
American companies established in 2015
Business services companies established in 2015
Companies based in Santa Clara, California
Companies listed on the Nasdaq
Employment websites in the United States
Freelance marketplace websites
Online marketplaces of the United States
Telecommuting